David H. Hoffman  (born May 22, 1967) is a former federal prosecutor and was Chicago's inspector general. Hoffman ran for the Illinois seat of the U.S. Senate in 2010 but lost to Alexi Giannoulias in the Democratic primary.

Early and personal life
Hoffman was raised in northern suburban Chicago by parents of Jewish and Puerto Rican descent. Hoffman graduated from New Trier High School in 1984. He graduated cum laude with a B.A. in history in from Yale University in 1988 and the University of Chicago Law School in 1995, where he was articles editor of the law review and head of the University of Chicago Law School Democrats. Hoffman was awarded the university's President's Award for Volunteer Service for founding Neighbors, a neighborhood-based community service program. Hoffman lives in the Wicker Park neighborhood of Chicago with his wife, Monique, from Downstate Alton, Illinois. They have two children, two dogs, and two cats. The Hoffmans are avid Chicago sports fans. Hoffman is an adjunct professor at the University of Chicago Law School, where he teaches public corruption and the law.

Congressman Boren's Office
After graduating from Yale, Hoffman spent three years working on Capitol Hill, where he served as press secretary and legislative assistant for foreign policy to U.S. Congressman David Boren (D-OK).

Clerkships
After his graduation from Law School, Hoffman served as a law clerk for Judge Dennis G. Jacobs, Hoffman also clerked for Supreme Court Chief Justice William Rehnquist. Hoffman, in response to questions about his experience clerking for conservative jurists has been quoted as saying, “If you’re lucky enough in Law School to be in a position to apply for a supreme court clerkship what the law professors will tell you is that you apply to all nine. Because it’s really an honor to clerk on the Supreme Court no matter who you clerk for. And you really can’t tell anything about someone’s ideology by who they clerk for… Judge Richard Posner, on the Appellate Court, who’s widely considered a conservative judge. He clerked for Justice Brennan, one of the great liberal Justices".

U.S. Attorney's Office
Hoffman served as an Assistant U.S. Attorney in Chicago from 1998–2005, and was appointed Deputy Chief of the Narcotics and Gangs Section by U.S. Attorney Patrick Fitzgerald. In this post, he led a newly created gang unit, supervised all federal gang investigations and prosecutions, and helped create a new federal-local gang investigation strategy that Justice Department officials used to train gang investigators around the country. He also served as co-leader of the office’s Project Safe Neighborhoods (PSN) anti-gun violence program, which helped reduce gun violence in some of Chicago’s most crime-ridden neighborhoods. Hoffman was one of the leaders in creating and running a highly praised program in which law enforcement and community organizations worked together in high-crime neighborhoods to persuade felons convicted of gun crimes not to carry guns.
While an Assistant U.S. Attorney, Hoffman investigated and prosecuted all types of federal crimes, including drug trafficking and money-laundering cases against street gangs and international drug cartels, and white-collar crimes including health care fraud, bank fraud, and tax fraud. He received the Director’s Award in 2002 for his prosecution of 48 defendants who “rented” babies to smuggle liquid cocaine in baby-formula cans from Panama to Chicago and other cities.

Chicago Inspector General
The Chicago Tribune Editorial Board described Hoffman in the following way, “Since 2005, Chicago has had a truly independent Inspector General”.

The mission of the Inspector General’s Office (“IGO”) is to root out corruption, waste, and mismanagement, while promoting effectiveness and efficiency in the City of Chicago. The IGO is a watchdog for the taxpayers of the City, and has jurisdiction to conduct investigations and audits over most aspects of City government.

Hoffman directed a 55-person staff of attorneys, investigators, and auditors that exposed bribery, fraud and theft schemes, contracting corruption, illegal employment practices, ethics violations, and extensive waste.

As part of Operation Crooked Code, his joint investigations with the FBI and other federal law enforcement agencies led to federal charges against numerous city employees and contractors and uncovered widespread corruption in Chicago’s system of building-safety and zoning inspections.

Illinois Reform Commission
In January 2009, Governor Pat Quinn appointed Hoffman to the 15-member Illinois Reform Commission, chaired by former U.S. Assistant Attorney Patrick M. Collins, which was charged with recommending anti-corruption and ethics reforms in the wake of former Governor Rod Blagojevich’s arrest. While participating in the Commission’s hearings and town meetings around Illinois, Hoffman and the other Commission members heard extensive testimony from citizens about their frustration with Illinois’ history of corruption and their desire for reform. He drafted substantial portions of the Commission’s proposed legislation regarding criminal law and contracting reforms, and testified at a number of legislative hearings on behalf of the Commission’s recommendations./

2010 Candidacy for US Senate

In 2009, Hoffman announced his intentions to run for the United States Senate seat held by Roland Burris after Burris, who was appointed by then Governor Rod Blagojevich to fill the seat vacated by Barack Obama following Obama's election as  President of the United States, announced he would not seek election to a full term. He was endorsed by every major newspaper in the state with the Chicago Tribune calling him “an incorruptible man who tells truth to power.". On February 2, 2010, Hoffman was narrowly defeated in the Democratic primary by state treasurer Alexi Giannoulias.

See also 
 List of law clerks of the Supreme Court of the United States (Chief Justice)

References

External links

Official Campaign Website

1967 births
Living people
American people of Jewish descent
American people of Puerto Rican descent
New Trier High School alumni
Yale University alumni
University of Chicago Law School alumni
Law clerks of the Supreme Court of the United States
Illinois Democrats
Assistant United States Attorneys
American prosecutors